This article lists the heads of government of the Kingdom of Sikkim from 1944 to 1975, when Sikkim became the 22nd state of India following a referendum.

List

(Dates in italics indicate de facto continuation of office)

See also
 Chogyal
 List of political officers in the Kingdom of Sikkim
 Kingdom of Sikkim
 History of Sikkim

References

External links
 

Government of Sikkim
History of Sikkim
Sikkim